Copco Veteran Football Club is a football club based in Ilemela, Mwanza, a port city on the shore of Lake Victoria, in northern Tanzania. The team is currently playing in the Tanzanian Championship.

History 
Copco FC was founded in the Buchosa Sengerema District, Mwanza region in 2013 but is currently based in Ilemela district in Mwanza. They are playing in the championship for the first time.

Colours and badge 
Copco FC's colors are blue at home and white when playing away. They also use black color as a third kit.
The Copco Veteran FC badge has the inception date (2013),the words michezo ni ajira and Tanzanian flag on a football.

Stadium 

Copco FC play their home matches at the Nyamagana stadium which capacity of 15000.

Supporters 
Copco FC draws its fan base from the Mwanza region, the political capital of Mwanza region.

Squad

References

External links 
 

Football clubs in Tanzania